Red Eve is a historical novel  with fantasy elements, by British writer H. Rider Haggard, set in the reign of Edward III. Red Eve depicts the Battle of Crécy and the Black Death, and also features a supernatural personification of Death called Murgh.

Reception
Discussing Red Eve, E. F. Bleiler stated "While the personalities are still stereotyped, the tendency to be sententious is not as obtrusive as usual, and the narrative is relatively brisk. The introduction of Murgh as a symbol is successful." Pamela Cleaver called Red Eve a "stirring tale" and said "the incidents...keep one reading until the end". However, Cleaver criticised the novel's characterisation, saying that that novel's principals were "all stock characters." Darrell Schweitzer described Red Eve as "a later novel of particular interest", saying it began as a "costume romance", but became a weird fiction novel with the "introduction of the character Murgh, a personification of the Black Death."

References

External links
Complete book at Project Gutenberg

1911 British novels
Novels about the Black Death
Fiction set in the 1340s
Hundred Years' War literature
Novels by H. Rider Haggard
English historical novels
English fantasy novels
Weird fiction novels